Kenny Rogers is the second studio album by Kenny Rogers from United Artists Records, released worldwide in 1977.  The album marked his first major solo success following the minor success of Love Lifted Me in 1976.

The album produced two singles.  The first single, 1976's "Laura (What He's Got That I Ain't Got?)", peaked at #19. This song was originally a #1 country hit for Leon Ashley in 1967. In 1977, Kenny gained stardom with the single "Lucille", which climbed to the top of the country charts (both in the U.S. and Canada) and placing him squarely on the U.S. Hot 100 in the #5 position. It also blew open his solo career in the UK, reaching #1 there.  Another track from the album is "I Wasn't Man Enough" which makes appearances on some of Rogers' greatest hits compilations in years to come.

This was the first of twelve No. 1 albums for Rogers on the Country chart.  It ranked as high as #30 overall and was certified Platinum in the U.S. (also reaching Gold in Canada).

Track listing

Personnel
 Kenny Rogers – lead vocals
 Bobby Wood, Charles "Chuck" Cochran, George Richey, Hargus "Pig" Robbins, Larry Butler – keyboards
 Shane Keister – Moog synthesizer
 Billy Sanford, Dale Sellers, David Kirby, Fred Carter Jr., Jerry Shook, Jimmy Capps, Johnny Christopher, Pete Wade, Ray Edenton, Reggie Young, Steve Gibson – guitars
 Pete Drake – steel guitar
 Joe Osborn – bass guitar
 Tommy Allsup – six-string bass guitar
 Bob Moore – upright bass
Buddy Harman, Jerry Carrigan, Kenny Malone – drums, percussion
 Tommy Williams – violin
 Brenton Banks, Byron Bach, Carl Gorodetzky, Gary Vanosdale, George Binkley, Lennie Haight, Marvin Chantry, Pam Sixfin, Roy Christensen, Sheldon Kurland, Stephanie Woolf, Steven Smith – strings
 Bill Justis – string arrangements
 Bergen White, Buzz Cason, Don Gant, Johnny MacRae, The Jordanaires, Larry Keith, Steve Pippin – backing vocals

Production
 Producer – Larry Butler
 Engineers – Harold Lee and Billy Sherrill
 Recorded at American Studios and Jack Clement Recording Studios (Nashville, TN).
 Mastered by Bob Sowell at Master Control (Nashville, TN).
 Art Direction – Ria Lewerke
 Photography – David Brandenberg
 Typography – Michael Manoogian

Charts

Weekly charts

Year-end charts

References 

1977 albums
Kenny Rogers albums
United Artists Records albums
Albums arranged by Bill Justis
Albums produced by Larry Butler (producer)